Cyril McNeile, MC (born Herman Cyril McNeile; 1888–1937) was a British soldier and author. During the First World War he wrote short stories based on his experiences in the trenches with the Royal Engineers. These were published in the Daily Mail under the pseudonym Sapper, the nickname of his regiment, and were later published as collections through Hodder & Stoughton. McNeile also wrote a series of articles titled The Making of an Officer, which appeared under the initials C. N., in five issues of The Times between 8 and 14 June 1916; these were also subsequently collected together and published. During the course of the war, McNeile wrote more than 80 collected and uncollected stories.

McNeile continued writing after he left the army in 1919, although he stopped writing war stories and began to publish thrillers. In 1920 he published Bulldog Drummond, whose eponymous hero became his best-known creation. The character was based on McNeile himself, his idea of an English gentleman and his friend Gerard Fairlie. McNeile wrote ten Bulldog Drummond novels, as well as three plays and a screenplay.

McNeile interspersed his Drummond work with other novels and story collections, including two characters who appeared as protagonists in their own works, Jim Maitland and Ronald Standish. McNeile was one of the most successful British popular authors of the inter-war period, before his death in 1937 from throat cancer, which has been attributed to being caught in a gas attack in the war.

Short story collections

Novels

Others

Notes and references 
Notes

References

Bibliography 

 
 
 
 
 

Journals

External links

 
 
 
 
 
 Images of the original dust jackets on McNeile's books.
 Portraits of McNeile at the National Portrait Gallery, London.

Bibliographies by writer
Bibliographies of British writers